Elizabeth Fondal Neufeld (born September 27, 1928) is a French-American geneticist whose research has focused on the genetic basis of metabolic disease in humans.

Life
Neufeld and her Russian Jewish family emigrated to the United States from Paris in 1940; they had left Europe as refugees to escape Nazi persecution. The family settled in New York, where she attended Hunter College High School before graduating from Queens College in 1948 with a Bachelor of Science. She went on to work as a research assistant at the Jackson Laboratory in Bar Harbor, Maine, looking at blood disorders in mice. Later on, she attended graduate school at University of California, Berkeley, where she earned a Ph.D. in 1956 for her work on nucleotides and complex carbohydrates.

Neufeld has been widely recognized for her contributions to science. She is a member of the National Academy of Sciences and the American Philosophical Society. She was elected to the American Academy of Arts and Sciences in 1977. Neufeld has been awarded the Wolf Prize, the Albert Lasker Award for Clinical Medical Research, and was awarded the National Medal of Science in 1994 "for her contributions to the understanding of the lysosomal storage diseases, demonstrating the strong linkage between basic and applied scientific investigation."

Neufeld retired in 2004 from UCLA as Chair of the Department of Biological Chemistry, a position she occupied since 1984.

Personal life 
Elizabeth Fondal married Benjamin S. Neufeld in 1951; they had two children together.

Selected publications 
Ohmi K, Greenberg DS, Rajavel KS, Ryazantsev S, Li HH, Neufeld EF., (2003), "Activated microglia in cortex of mouse models of mucopolysaccharidoses I and IIIB." Proceedings of the National Academy of Sciences of the United States of America. 100: 1902-7. PMID 12576554 DOI: 10.1073/Pnas.252784899 

Elizabeth F. Neufeld, W.Z. Hassid,(1963), "Biosynthesis of Saccharides from Glycopyranosyl Esters of Nucleotides (“Sugar Nucleotides”), Editor(s): Melville L. Wolfrom, R. Stuart Tipson, Advances in Carbohydrate Chemistry,Academic Press,Volume 18,1963,Pages 309-356,ISSN 0096-5332,ISBN 9780120072187, https://doi.org/10.1016/S0096-5332(08)60246-5.

See also 
 Inborn error of metabolism

References

Further reading 
 
 Nicole Kresge, Robert D. Simoni, Robert L. Hill, (2007), "Lysosomal Storage Disease Factors: the Work of Elizabeth F. Neufeld", Journal of Biological Chemistry, Vol 282, Issue 20,Pages e15-e17,https://doi.org/10.1073/pnas.252784899

External links 
 Home Page at UCLA

1928 births
French emigrants to the United States
20th-century French Jews
Hunter College High School alumni
Queens College, City University of New York alumni
University of California, Berkeley alumni
American geneticists
National Medal of Science laureates
Living people
Wolf Prize in Medicine laureates
Members of the United States National Academy of Sciences
Jewish American scientists
Recipients of the Lasker-DeBakey Clinical Medical Research Award
Scientists from New York (state)
21st-century American Jews
Members of the American Philosophical Society
Members of the National Academy of Medicine